The Voice of Ireland is the Irish edition of the international TV franchise The Voice, a reality singing competition created by media tycoon John de Mol. The first series began airing from 8 January 2012 on RTÉ One. The coaches originally were Bressie, Sharon Corr, Kian Egan and Brian Kennedy. Kennedy left after the first series and was replaced by Jamelia. After the second series, Corr quit the show owing to other commitments and was replaced by Dolores O'Riordan. Following series 3, Dolores and Jamelia quit. The coaches for series 4 were Bressie, Una Healy, Kian Egan and Rachel Stevens. The show was hosted by Kathryn Thomas and co-hosted by Eoghan McDermott, who also presented backstage show The Voice After Party in Series 3.

The series was part of The Voice franchise and was based on a similar competition format in the Netherlands entitled The Voice of Holland. The show replaced The All Ireland Talent Show. One of the important premises of the show is the quality of the singing talent. Four coaches, themselves popular performing artists, train the talents in their group and occasionally perform with them. Talents are selected in blind auditions, where the coaches cannot see, but only hear the auditioner.

The TV show "blind" auditions were held at the Helix, and were broadcast for the first five weeks of the series. The Battle Phase was broadcast over three weeks from the second week of February to the last week of February each year. The winner of the show is offered a recording contract with Universal Music Ireland worth €100,000.

The current and final holder of the crown The Voice of Ireland is the series 5 champion, Michael Lawson.

On 3 August 2016, it was announced that the show was going to be replaced by an Irish version of Strictly Come Dancing.

History
The show replaced The All Ireland Talent Show. The Voice of Ireland aired on RTÉ One and was produced by Screentime Shinawil Productions.

Auditions 
The Blind Auditions for Series 1 took place at The Helix, Dublin, between 26 and 31 October 2011 in front of a live audience. The first series began on 8 January 2012 and finished on 29 April 2012. The Blind auditions for Series 2 took place at The Helix, Dublin, between 21 and 25 October 2012 at The Helix. The later seasons followed a very similar schedule.

Scheduling and filming
The show took place in The Helix in Dublin. The main show aired for 90 minutes. The results show aired for 30 minutes. The show aired on Sunday nights. Filming for the Blind Auditions took place in October each year in Dublin's Helix.

Format
The series consists of three phases:
 Blind audition
 Battle phase
 Live performance shows

Blind audition
Four coaches, all famous musicians, choose teams of artists through a blind audition process. Each coach has the length of the artists performance to decide if he or she wants that artist on his or her team (twelve in the first series, more in the second); if two or more coaches want the same artist then the singer gets to choose which coach they want to work with. An addition to the third season was that RTÉ 2fm selected 5 wildcards to audition.

Battle phase
Each team of singers is mentored and developed by their coach. In the second stage, coaches have two of their team members battle against each other by singing the same song, with the coach choosing which team member will advance to the next stage. For the third series a new feature was added whereby if an act lost their battle, they are not immediately out of the competition. Each coach has one 'Steal' where they get the opportunity to take one losing act and have them join their team for the live shows. They do this by pressing their 'I Want You' button.

Live performance shows
In the final phase, the remaining contestants compete against each other in live broadcasts. The television audience help to decide who moves on. When one team member remains for each coach, the contestants compete against each other in the finale.

Post-The Voice of Ireland
The winner of the show is offered a recording contract with Universal Music Ireland worth €100,000.

Coaches and hosts

Coaches' teams and their artists
Key
 – Winning coach. Winners are in bold, eliminated contestants in small font.

Series overview
Warning: the following table presents a significant amount of different colors.

Reception

Series averages

Ratings
RTÉ described the first ever episode as "a great ratings success" as it pulled in an average of 708,000 viewers and peaked at 1.2 million. It was later reported that the first 5 episodes pulled in an average of 701,000 viewers a week.

Audience ratings for the first series, initially promising, had plunged by 50% by the time the live shows were broadcast and were reported to be unfavourable when compared to ratings held by its predecessor The All Ireland Talent Show.

The Voice After Party
The Voice After Party is a spin-off show, discussing each show afterwards.

Music releases by The Voice of Ireland contestants
As of July 2016, The Voice of Ireland has had thirteen singles and four albums chart on the top 100 on the Irish Singles and Albums Charts.

Singles

Albums

References

 
2016 Irish television series endings
Irish talent shows
Irish television series based on non-Irish television series
RTÉ original programming